The India cricket team toured England in July 2022 to play three One Day International (ODI) and three Twenty20 International (T20I) matches against the England cricket team. In September 2021, the England and Wales Cricket Board (ECB) confirmed that India would also play a one-off Test match, after the fifth Test in 2021 was cancelled. The following month, the ECB confirmed that the rescheduled match would determine the outcome of last summer's Test series, and was played ahead of the T20I series.

In June 2022, following the conclusion of England's ODI series in the Netherlands, England's Eoin Morgan announced his retirement from international cricket. As a result, Jos Buttler was appointed as the new captain of England's white-ball teams. Adil Rashid was also made unavailable for the series in order to make the Hajj pilgrimage to Mecca.

India won the first T20I match by 50 runs. India won the second T20I by 49 runs to win the series with a match to play. Despite a century from Suryakumar Yadav, England won the third T20I by 17 runs, with India winning the series 2–1.

In the first ODI match, England were bowled out for 110 runs inside 26 overs, with Jasprit Bumrah taking the best bowling figures for India in an ODI in England. India went on to win by ten wickets, the first time that India had recorded a ten-wicket victory against England in an ODI match. England last lost an ODI match by ten wickets in March 2011, when Sri Lanka beat them in the quarter-finals of the 2011 Cricket World Cup. England won the second ODI by 100 runs to level the series. Reece Topley took his first five-wicket haul and the best bowling figures for England in an ODI match with 6 wickets for 24 runs. India won the third and final match by five wickets to win the series 2–1, with Rishabh Pant scoring his first century in ODI cricket.

Squads

Ahead of the third ODI match, Harry Brook, Matt Parkinson and Phil Salt were released from England's squad to allow them to play in Finals Day of the 2022 T20 Blast.

Warm-up matches
In April 2022, the ECB confirmed that India would play two T20 warm-up fixtures, against Derbyshire and Northamptonshire. India were also scheduled to play a four-day first-class match against Leicestershire. However, the match was downgraded from its first-class status, with 13 players playing per side, and four of India's team drafted into the Leicestershire squad.

T20I series

1st T20I

2nd T20I

3rd T20I

ODI series

1st ODI

2nd ODI

3rd ODI

References

External links
 Series home at ESPN Cricinfo

2022 in English cricket
2022 in Indian cricket
International cricket competitions in 2022
Indian cricket tours of England